Tonghe may refer to:

Tonghe (983–1012), era name used by Emperor Shengzong of Liao

Places in China
Tonghe County, Heilongjiang
Tonghe Town, Heilongjiang
Tonghe, Guangxi, in Pingnan County, Guangxi
Tonghe Township, Tanghe County, Henan
Tonghe Subdistrict, Guangzhou, Guangdong
Tonghe Subdistrict, Pingdu, Shandong